Réalisation d'art cinématographique was a French production company and film distributor. It produced the classic French film Grand Illusion (1937), which was the first ever foreign language film to be nominated for the Academy Award for Best Picture. The nomination officially went to the production company as a whole, because until 1950 the award was not given to individuals.

Filmography 
1937 : La grande illusion 
1938 : Ramuntcho 
1938 : La Marseillaise
1941 : Le Pavillon brûle 
1942 : La Nuit fantastique 
1949 : D'homme à hommes

References

Film production companies of France